Benjamin Richard "Ben" Powell (born 28 November 1984 in Helensvale, Queensland, Queensland) is a former Australian motorcycle speedway rider. He retired from the sport in 2008 after receiving a ban from the Speedway Control Bureau.

Career

Club
Powell signed for Sheffield Tigers's Conference League side, Sheffield Prowlers in 2002. He then spent two seasons with Carmarthen Dragons before they folded and he moved to Rye House where he rode for Rye House Raiders in the Conference League with the number one race jacket. He was also given several outings in the Rye House Rockets Premier League side in 2006. His performances improved and he was signed by Birmingham Brummies for his first full Premier League season. He averaged close to six points a meeting with the Brummies in 2007.
 
Another move, this time to Newcastle Diamonds in 2008, didn't work out and Scunthorpe Scorpions signed him at the beginning of June 2008. Powell was sacked by Scunthorpe after he launched his motorcycle at Newcastle rider Kenni Larsen during a meeting at his former club in October. Powell announced he was retiring from British speedway after he was later banned for 12 months by the Speedway Control Bureau.

International
Powell previously represented New Zealand in the World Long Track Championship and World Under-21 Championship but is now a full-time resident in the United Kingdom, and had expressed a desire to ride for the Great Britain national speedway team in the future.

References 

1984 births
Living people
Australian speedway riders
Sportspeople from the Gold Coast, Queensland
Sheffield Tigers riders
Coventry Bees riders
Mildenhall Fen Tigers riders
Rye House Rockets riders
Birmingham Brummies riders
Newcastle Diamonds riders
Scunthorpe Scorpions riders